Drenje Brdovečko is a small settlement near Brdovec, Zagreb County. It has a total land area of 7.13 km2. According to the 2011 census, it has a population of 685.

References

Populated places in Zagreb County